Dr. Jean Ramjohn-Richards (born 1936) is a Trinidadian doctor and the former First Lady of Trinidad and Tobago from 2003 until 2013.  She was born in San Fernando and was educated at Naparima Girls' High School and Naparima College before attending medical school in Ireland.  She is married to former President George Maxwell Richards and has two children.  She is a cousin of former President Noor Hassanali and Olympian Manny Ramjohn.

In addition to her duties as wife of the President, Dr. Ramjohn-Richards worked as an Anaesthetist at the Mount Hope Maternity Hospital at Champs Fleurs, Trinidad, where she has practiced since its opening in 1980. Her husband took office in March 2003.

References

 Our Sister, the First Lady - Val Turton Carl Osborne Foundation 

1936 births
Living people
First Ladies of Trinidad and Tobago
Trinidad and Tobago anaesthetists
21st-century Trinidad and Tobago women politicians
21st-century Trinidad and Tobago politicians
Trinidad and Tobago people of Indian descent
People from San Fernando, Trinidad and Tobago
20th-century Trinidad and Tobago physicians
21st-century Trinidad and Tobago physicians
Women anesthesiologists
20th-century women physicians
21st-century women physicians